Shock is a 2004 Indian Tamil-language supernatural horror film directed and produced by Thiagarajan. The film stars his son Prashanth and Meena, while Abbas, Thiagarajan, Suhasini, Kalairani, and Sarath Babu, amongst others played the supporting roles. The music is composed by Salim–Sulaiman. The film was a remake of Ram Gopal Varma's Hindi film, Bhoot (2003), and was released on 23 July 2004. The film received a positive response from critics and was a box office success.

Plot
The film revolves around Vasanth, a stock analyst, and his wife Malini. The two are in search of a flat in Chennai. Vasanth finds the perfect place on the 12th floor of a high-rise apartment building.

However, the apartment has a horrifying past. The previous occupant of the flat, Manju, killed her child, and then jumped from the balcony and died. Malini learns about this incident and becomes oddly fixated with the story. Then, a series of inexplicable experiences drive her to near madness. Vasanth is convinced that she has developed some sort of psychological disorder. He consults a psychiatrist named Dr. Rajan  and begins to doubt that his wife is suffering from a psychological disease. The couple's maid believes Malini to be possessed and calls in an exorcist .

Meanwhile, seemingly unrelated events take place around the building: the watchman was murdered with his head completely twisted; one of the residents, Ajay, behaves erratically; and a murder occurs. Inspector Paramasivam  is sent to investigate the murder.

The exorcist spends time with Malini and learns that she is possessed by Manju. Vasanth goes to Manju's mother, and with her help, the possessed Malini lets everyone know that Ajay lusted after Manju and forced himself on her, and to save herself, she jumped from her balcony. Later, Ajay realized that her son had witnessed the murder and got the watchman to throw the little boy from the balcony, and creating a fake story that the woman killed her son and then committed suicide. By killing the watchman via Malini, Manju takes revenge for her son's death and wants to kill Ajay. At the last minute, the mother comes and tells her dead daughter's spirit that she cannot take revenge from Ajay by making Malini a murderer, so Manju leaves Malini's body, and Ajay is thrown in front of everyone.

The story ends with Ajay going to prison and Parmasivam telling him to rot in a jail cell forever. After Paramasivam leaves the cell, Ajay finds himself face-to-face with Manju. He starts begging for mercy, but his voice fades out as she draws closer; it is implied that she kills him.

Cast
 Prashanth as Vasanth
 Meena as Malini / Manju
 Abbas as Ajay
 Thiagarajan as Police Inspector Paramasivam
 Sarath Babu as Dr. Rajan
 Suhasini as Exorcist
 Devan as Psychiatrist
 K. R. Vijaya as Manju's mother
 Kalairani as Maid

Production
In October 2003, director Thiagarajan bought the Tamil remake rights of Ram Gopal Varma's 2003 Hindi supernatural thriller Bhoot in October 2003, after the original had become a box office success. Thiagarajan's son Prashanth and Simran were signed on to play the lead roles, though the actress later opted out citing her impending marriage as a reason. The team then announced that actress Reemma Sen had replaced Simran in the film, though Sen called the statement "premature". Reports then suggested that Laila had replaced her though this proved to be untrue. The leading female role was later taken by Meena, who lost weight to portray the role which she described as her "most challenging" til date.

An early press release had announced that Asin, Khushbu, Ramya Krishnan, Raghuvaran and Pasupathy would also be in the film, but none of the actors eventually starred. Similarly Kanika and Sujatha were initially speculated to appear in the film, but did not make the final cast. Abbas joined the cast to play a negative role, while K. R. Vijaya, Suhasini and Sarath Babu were also selected to essay supporting roles. Subtle changes were made to the script of the Tamil version to make it adaptable for Tamil audiences. During production, the team revealed that they hoped to introduce a new form of technology in the film which would prevent the film being seen on unlicensed copies. The film's shoot was completed within twenty six days, with meticulous pre-planning arranged by Thiagarajan. The makers also considered producing a Kannada and Malayalam version of the film, but eventually did not carry through with the idea.

Release
The film opened in July 2004 to positive reviews, with a reviewer from Indiaglitz.com noting the makers "deserve an appreciation for his honest and sincere attempt on the screen." Malathi Rangarajan of The Hindu wrote "Even at the outset director Thiagarajan has to be congratulated upon for not hampering the tempo with the usual frills of solos and song and dance routines", though added " the film doesn't frighten you as much as they said it would". Sify.com's reviewer credited Meena's performance noting "watching her work up a maniacal frenzy or slip into a pathetic state of helplessness, only to let out a deathly scream, is an experience not worth missing". Another critic also noted the director "has done a wonderful job in creating a thriller with minimum dialogues", adding "Meena carries the whole film on her shoulders and has given a splendid feat. Meena’s mind-blowing act that actually saves Shock from its rickety script."

See also
List of ghost films

References

External links
 

2004 films
Tamil remakes of Hindi films
Indian supernatural horror films
Indian ghost films
2000s Tamil-language films